Johnsons Crossing or Johnson's Crossing is a settlement in Yukon, Canada. It is located at historical mile 836 of the Alaska Highway, at the junction of the Canol Road where the highway crosses the Teslin River.

Geography

Climate

Demographics 

References

Settlements in Yukon